Amy Gutierrez (born November 14, 1973), also known as Amy G, is an American sports journalist and writer.

Life and education

Amy U'Ren Gutierrez was born in San Mateo, California and raised in Petaluma, California. She attended La Tercera Elementary School, Kenilworth Junior High and Casa Grande High School. At Casa Grande she played softball, basketball, and volleyball. Gutierrez wanted to be a broadcast journalist. She graduated from the University of California, Davis in 1995 with degrees in rhetoric and communications. While at Davis she performed in the school's concert band, playing the flute. She is married to sports journalist Paul Gutierrez. They live in Petaluma and are parents of a son and daughter.

Career

After graduation, Gutierrez first moved to Washington, D.C. before relocating to work as a television producer for Foxsports while living in Los Angeles. While there, she filled in for a sick co-worker and appeared on air. She returned to the San Francisco Bay Area and worked as a basketball journalist, hosting her own television program. Around 2009, Gutierrez became the sideline reporter for the NBC Sports Bay Area, for whom she covers the San Francisco Giants. She also contributes to G-Mag and has her own webcast called Amy G's Giants Xclusive.

Gutierrez, who writes all her own stories, reports on the "emotional, nontechnical side of the game," in order to attract both frequent and occasional game viewers. She reviews her stories with other reporters prior to producing them.

Smarty Marty's Got Game

In 2012, Gutierrez was asked to write a book about baseball for children ages 6–9 by the Cameron + Company publishing house. The book, Smarty Marty's Got Game, was published in 2013. It was illustrated by Adam McCauley. The title character, Marty, is based upon Amy's mother and grandmother and is named after Gutierrez's grandmother who died just before Gutierrez started writing the book. Marty is a little girl who teaches her little brother about baseball, emulating the relationship of Gutierrez's own children.

Publications

Gutierrez, Amy and Adam McCauley. Smarty Marty's Got Game. Petaluma: Cameron + Company (2013). 
Gutierrez, Amy and Ariana Killora. Smarty Marty Steps Up Her Game. Petaluma: Cameron Kids (2017).

References

External links

Mom with a mic: Giants television reporter Amy Gutierrez makes her mark in baseball while gaining her footing as a parent via the Marin Independent Journal

Living people
People from San Mateo, California
American sports journalists
San Francisco Giants announcers
Major League Baseball broadcasters
University of California, Davis alumni
1973 births